Dysgonia macrorhyncha is a moth of the family Noctuidae first described by George Hampson in 1913. It is found in Africa, including South Africa and Zambia.

References

Dysgonia
Fauna of Zambia
Moths of Africa